Diego Lizardi Marcial (October 10, 1975 – February 21, 2008) was a Puerto Rican athlete specialized in gymnastics. During his career, Lizardi represented Puerto Rico in several international tournaments including two Summer Olympic Games.

On February 21, 2008, Lizardi died in a car accident when his car struck a parked truck on the back. The circumstances of the accident are still being investigated.

Biography
Diego Lizardi Marcial was born in Hato Rey, Puerto Rico. In 1981, while 6 years old, he started studying at the Gymnastic School in Cupey. Later, he studied at the Interamerican University of Puerto Rico in Hato Rey.

He started rising as a gifted gymnast winning several national championships in "All Around" competitions. From 1988 to 2001, he gathered 13 championships in various levels.

In 1990, Lizardi participated in his first international competition at the 1990 Central American and Caribbean Games held in Mexico. The Puerto Rican team rose in this tournament with the bronze medal. In 1993, he rose with the silver medal at the same tournament, this time held at Ponce, Puerto Rico. He also has won 9 world championships during this period.

In 1996, he participated at the 1996 Summer Olympics in Atlanta, finishing at the 64th spot. He participated again at the 2000 Summer Olympics in Sydney, Australia.

In 2003, he was selected as Puerto Rico's flag bearer for the 2003 Pan American Games held at Santo Domingo, Dominican Republic.

After retiring as a competitive athlete, Lizardi continued collaborating with the Puerto Rico Gymnastics Federation while he created private gymnastics training centers throughout Puerto Rico.

Lizardi died February 21, 2008, in a late night car accident when his car struck a parked truck. At the time, he was working to open another gymnastics school for kids in Puerto Rico's third largest city, Ponce.

Hundreds of Puerto Ricans attended funeral services at the Puerto Rico Olympic Headquarters in Old San Juan where, in the presence of Lizardi's widow and parents, acting Governor Fernando Bonilla declared him to be Puerto Rico's "Eternal Standard-Bearer"  ("El Eterno Abanderado") and then Puerto Rico Senate President Kenneth McClintock made a commitment to appropriate the funds necessary to hold the International Gymnastics Competition that Lizardi proposed to hold in 2009 in San Juan in his last conversation with McClintock's wife, San Juan Sports and Recreation Director María Elena Batista. Then Sports and Recreation Secretary David Bernier seconded the senator's proposal.  Lizardi's body was later cremated.

In June, 2008, at the request of Senate of Puerto Rico President Kenneth McClintock, Senate Budget Committee Chairwoman Migdalia Padilla and former Senate President Antonio Fas Alzamora, the Puerto Rico Legislature appropriated $25,000 for a statue of Diego Lizardi to be placed at the Puerto Rico Sports Museum in Guaynabo, Puerto Rico.

Awards

Central American and Caribbean Games
 Mexico 1990 - Bronze with team
 Ponce 1993 - Silver in Floor exercise
 Maracaibo 1998 - Gold in Still rings

Pan American Games
 Cuba 1991 - Fourth place with team
 Winnipeg 1999 - Bronze in Still rings

Iberoamerican Championship
 Brazil - Gold medal

International Cup
 San Juan 1997 - First place in Still rings, Floor, and "All Around"

See also
 Sports in Puerto Rico

References

External links
USA Gymnastics International Athlete Biography
Lizardi's Career
News about his death at Yahoo!
News about his death at Primera Hora

1975 births
2008 deaths
Puerto Rican male artistic gymnasts
Gymnasts at the 1999 Pan American Games
Gymnasts at the 2003 Pan American Games
Gymnasts at the 1996 Summer Olympics
Gymnasts at the 2000 Summer Olympics
Olympic gymnasts of Puerto Rico
Road incident deaths in Puerto Rico
Pan American Games medalists in gymnastics
Pan American Games bronze medalists for Puerto Rico
Medalists at the 1999 Pan American Games